Kolur Basavanagoud (1 July 1934 – 25 November 2022) was an Indian politician, educationist, and industrialist who served as a member of the Indian Parliament in the 13th Lok Sabha from the Bellary Lok Sabha constituency. He was a member of the Indian National Congress.

Basavanagoud was instrumental in the development and formation of two Engineering Colleges, one Polytechnic and one Institute of Management Studies for Veerasaiva Vidya Vardhaka Sangha.

Early life and background 
Kolur Basavanagoud was born to Shri K. Thimmanagoud and Smt Hompamma on 01 Jul 1934 in Kolur village of Bellary district, Karnataka. He completed his education at S.G. Junior College and Veerasaiva College, Bellary, Karnataka and Hindu College, Guntur, Andhra Pradesh.

Personal life 
Kolur Basavanagoud married K. Kamakshamma on 15 May 1960. They have two sons and one daughter.

Electoral history

Positions held 
 Chairman, District Congress Campaign Committee for Lok Sabha and Assembly Elections, 1999
 Joint Secretary of V.V. Sangha, Bellary
 Member of Zonal Railway Users Committee
 President, Lions Club, Bellary, 1975–78
 President, Youth Congress, Bellary 1965-70
 Secretary, Academic Council, Gulbarga University

References 

1934 births
2022 deaths
Indian National Congress politicians
Lok Sabha members from Karnataka
People from Bellary district
Indian industrialists
Karnataka academics